Acanthostichus brevicornis is a species of ant belonging to the genus Acanthostichus. Emery first described the species in 1894, and a synonym was given by Bruch in 1924. Their distribution is in South America, in the countries of Argentina, Brazil, Guyana, Paraguay and Suriname.

References

External links

Dorylinae
Hymenoptera of South America
Invertebrates of Paraguay
Invertebrates of Guyana
Fauna of Suriname
Insects described in 1894